Gaeltacht an Láir is an Irish-speaking area in central County Donegal, Ireland. It centres on the village of Baile na Finne and stretches south to Gleann Colm Cille and north to Fanad and Rosguill. There are nearly 7,000 people living in the area and 2,000 daily Irish speakers.

Baile na Finne
There are over 1,200 people living in the area and 500 Irish speakers.

The following is a list of EDs (Electoral Divisions) around Baile na Finne:

 Baile na Finne (296) (59%)
 Min an Laban (51) (3%)
 Sui Corr (14) (71%)
 Mhin Carraigeach (11) (9%)
 An Clochan (488) (38%)
 An Ghrafaidh (192) (56%)
 Gleann Leithin (167) (57%)

Gleann Colmcille
There are over 3,000 people living in the area and 850 Irish speakers.

The following is a list of EDs around the Gleann Colmcille area:

 Gleann Colmcille (689) (37%)
 Malainn Bhig (377) (26%)
 Cill Ghabhlaigh (374) (36%)
 Cro Chaorach (134) (19%)
 Cill Cartaigh (627) (22%)
 An Leargaidh Mhor (378) (27%)
 Inis Caoil (112) (18%)
 Gleann Gheis (154) (16%)
 Maol Mosog (137) (13%)
 Ard an Ratha (52) (13%)
 Na Gleannta (115) (13%)

Fanad / Rosguill
There are over 2,500 people living in the area and 650 Irish speakers.

The village of Carraig Airt is at the centre of this northernmost Gaeltacht in Ireland. It mainly covers the Fanad and Rosguill area.

The following is a list of EDs in the area around Carrig AIrt:

 Carraig Airt (382) (17%)
 Fanad (711) (30%)
 Rosguill (782) (33%)
 Creamghort (281) (20%)
 Grianphort (19) (15%)
 An Cheathru Chaol (20) (10%)
 Cnoc Colbha (110) (10%)
 Loch Caol (34) (20%)
 An Tearmann (183) (21%)
 Crioch na Smear (38) (13%)
 Dun Fionnachaidh (58) (8%)
 Caislean na dTuath (34) (2%)

See also
County Galway
Galway City Gaeltacht
Gaeltacht Cois Fharraige
Conamara Theas
Aran Islands
Joyce Country
County Donegal
Gaoith Dhobhair
Na Rosa
Cloch Cheann Fhaola
County Kerry
Gaeltacht Corca Dhuibhne
County Mayo
Gaeltacht Iorrais agus Acaill

External links
Gaeltacht an Lair definition
Gaeltacht Irish language use 2007

Gaeltacht places in County Donegal
Gaeltacht towns and villages